Aubrey Davis Park, formerly the Mercer Island Lid and First Hill Lid, is a park lid covering  of Interstate 90 (I-90) between West Mercer Way and 76th Avenue Southeast on Mercer Island. The park was created as to minimize the impact of I-90, opening to the public in the 1990s. Former Mercer Island mayor  Aubrey Davis lobbied for the park's creation in the 1970s. After his death in 2013, the park was renamed after him.

See also
List of structures built on top of freeways

References

External links
Park profile

Interstate 90
Parks in Seattle
Transportation in King County, Washington
Transportation in Seattle
Road tunnels in Washington (state)